San Stefano can refer to:

Places

Egypt
San Stefano (neighborhood), a neighborhood in Alexandria, Egypt
San Stefano Grand Plaza, a structural complex in Alexandria, Egypt

Europe
San Stefano (village), a village in Bulgaria
San Stefano, an historical name of a village west of Constantinople, now Yeşilköy, a neighbourhood of the Bakırköy district of Istanbul, Turkey
Santo Stefano Rotondo, an ancient basilica church in Rome

Treaty
Treaty of San Stefano, a treaty between Russia and the Ottoman Empire

See also 
Santo Stefano (disambiguation)